The Savoy Conference of 1661 was a significant liturgical discussion that took place, after the Restoration of Charles II, in an attempt to effect a reconciliation within the Church of England.

Proceedings

It was convened by Gilbert Sheldon, in his lodgings at the Savoy Hospital in London. The Conference sessions began on 15 April 1661, and continued for around four months. By June, a deadlock became apparent.

The conference was attended by commissioners: 12 Anglican bishops, and 12 representative ministers of the Puritan and Presbyterian factions. Each side also had nine deputies (called assistants or coadjutors). The nominal chairman was Accepted Frewen, the Archbishop of York. The object was to revise the Book of Common Prayer. Richard Baxter for the Presbyterian side presented a new liturgy, but this was not accepted. As a result the Church of England retained internal tensions about governance and theology, while a significant number of dissenters left its structure and created non-conformist groups retaining Puritan theological commitments.

In 1662 the Act of Uniformity followed, mandating the usage of the 1662 Book of Common Prayer and spurring the Great Ejection.

Commissioners

The nominated commissioners and deputies were as follows:

 Accepted Frewen, Archbishop of York
 Gilbert Sheldon, Bishop of London
 John Cosin, Bishop of Durham
 John Warner, Bishop of Rochester
 Henry King, Bishop of Chichester
 Humphrey Henchman, Bishop of Salisbury
 George Morley, Bishop of Worcester
 Robert Sanderson, Bishop of Lincoln
 Benjamin Laney, Bishop of Peterborough
 Brian Walton, Bishop of Chester
 Richard Sterne, Bishop of Carlisle
 John Gauden, Bishop of Exeter

For the presbyterians:

 Edward Reynolds, Bishop of Norwich
 Anthony Tuckney
 John Conant
 William Spurstow
 John Wallis
 Thomas Manton
 Edmund Calamy
 Richard Baxter
 Arthur Jackson
 Thomas Case
 Samuel Clarke
 Matthew Newcomen

Deputies

On the episcopal side there were:

 John Earle, Dean of Westminster
 Peter Heylin Sub-dean of Westminster.
 John Hacket
 John Barwick
 Peter Gunning
 John Pearson
 Thomas Pierce
 Anthony Sparrow
 Herbert Thorndike

On the presbyterian side there were:

 Thomas Horton
 Thomas Jacomb
 William Bates
 John Rawlinson
 William Cooper
 John Lightfoot
 John Collinges
 Benjamin Woodbridge

There was to have been one more deputy on the presbyterian side, Roger Drake. A clerical error caused his name to appear as "William Drake" in the official document, and he did not actually attend.

Publications
 "Order of the Savoy Conference," in Gee and Hardy Documents Illustrative of English Church History, pp. 588–94 (London, 1896)
 Prof. Charles Woodruff Shields, Book of the Common Prayer... as amended by Westminster Divines, 1661 (Philadelphia, 1867; new ed., New York, 1880).
 Daniel Neal, History of the Puritans, part iv (New York, 1863)

References

 
1661 in England